Welfare biology is a proposed cross-disciplinary field of research to study the positive and negative well-being of sentient individuals in relation to their environment. Yew-Kwang Ng first advanced the field in 1995. Since then, its establishment has been advocated for by a number of writers, including philosophers, who have argued for the importance of creating the research field, particularly in relation to wild animal suffering. Some researchers have put forward examples of existing research that welfare biology could draw upon and suggested specific applications for the research's findings.

History 
Welfare biology was first proposed by the welfare economist Yew-Kwang Ng, in his 1995 paper "Towards welfare biology: Evolutionary economics of animal consciousness and suffering". In the paper, Ng defines welfare biology as the "study of living things and their environment with respect to their welfare (defined as net happiness, or enjoyment minus suffering)." He also distinguishes between "affective" and "non-affective" sentients, affective sentients being individuals with the capacity for perceiving the external world and experiencing pleasure or pain, while non-affective sentients have the capacity for perception, with no corresponding experience; Ng argues that because the latter experience no pleasure or suffering, "[t]heir welfare is necessarily zero, just like nonsentients". He concludes, based on his modelling of evolutionary dynamics, that suffering dominates enjoyment in nature.

Matthew Clarke and Ng, in 2006, used Ng's welfare biology framework to analyse the costs, benefits and welfare implications of the culling of kangaroos—classified as affective sentients—in Puckapunyal, Australia. They concluded that while their discussion "may give some support to the culling of kangaroos or other animals in certain circumstances, a more preventive measure may be superior to the resort to culling". In the same year, Thomas Eichner and Rüdiger Pethi analyzed Ng's model, raising concern regarding a lack of appropriate determinants of the welfare of organisms because of the infancy of welfare biology.

In 2016, Ng argued that welfare biology could help resolve the paradox within animal welfare science, first raised by Marian Dawkins, on the difficulty of studying animal feelings, by answering "difficult questions regarding animal welfare"; in the paper, Ng also offered various practical proposals for improving the welfare of captive animals. Todd K. Shackelford and Sayma H. Chowdhury, in response to Ng, argued that rather than focusing on improving the welfare of captive animals, that it would be better to not breed them in the first place, as this would "eliminate their suffering altogether". 

Ng published an update to his original 1995 paper, with Zach Groff, in 2019, which found an error in his original model, leading to a negation of the original conclusion and a revised conception of the extent of suffering in nature as less pessimistic.

A chapter on welfare biology by the moral philosophers Catia Faria and Oscar Horta is included in the 2019 book The Routledge Handbook of Animal Ethics. In the chapter, they argue that welfare biology could be partially developed from animal welfare science, but its focus would be broader because it wouldn't only focus on studying animals under human control. Faria and Horta also assert that welfare biology could be developed from ecology, with a focus on how the well-being of sentient individuals is affected by their environments. They raise a concern of what they see as the minimization of the importance of animal well-being, caused by widespread speciesist and environmentalist beliefs among life scientists and the general public, which they argue could hamper the development of welfare biology. Faria and Horta conclude that the "expected value of developing welfare biology is extremely high" because of the massive extent of animal suffering in the wild, which refutes commonly conceived idyllic conceptions of nature.

Some researchers have emphasised the importance of life history theory to welfare biology, as they argue certain traits of life history may predispose certain individuals to worse welfare outcomes and that this has a strong relationship with habitat fragmentation sensitivity. It has also been suggested that while welfare biology, as a field in its infancy, lacks sufficient empirical studies on the welfare of wild animals, it can make up for this through the use of existing demographic data, currently used to inform biodiversity conservation, to inform future research efforts. Reviewing the welfare implications of fire on wild animals has been cited as an example of using knowledge drawn from existing ecology studies to establish the field of welfare biology and identify future directions of research. The application of welfare biology to rewilding projects has additionally been a subject of investigation, with "collaboration between local people, conservationists, authorities and policymakers" suggested as a means of establishing welfare biology as a discipline. 

Researchers in environmental economics have drawn attention to Ng's claim in his original paper that the "time is ripe for the recognition of welfare biology as a valid field of scientific study", yet after 25 years, welfare biology as a field of research has yet to take off.

Animal Ethics and Wild Animal Initiative are two organizations working on promoting the establishment of welfare biology as a field of research.

Proposed subdisciplines

Urban welfare ecology 

Catia Faria and Oscar Horta have proposed urban welfare ecology as a subdiscipline of welfare biology, which would study the well-being of animals living in urban, suburban and industrial ecosystems. They suggest that much research has already been carried out on animals in these areas, but with the intention of eliminating their negative impact on humans, or to conserve animals of particular species. Faria and Horta argue that such knowledge can be applied to help mitigate the harms that these animals experience and that such environments are perfect for intervention experiments because such ecosystems are already greatly under human control and that the findings could be applied to improve the assessments of the well-being of animals in other ecosystems.

Relation to wild animal suffering 

Some writers in the field of animal ethics have argued that there are compelling moral reasons to reduce the suffering of sentient individuals and that following this line of reasoning, humans should undertake interventions to reduce the suffering of wild animals; they claim that because ecosystems are not sentient, that they consequently lack the capacity to care about biodiversity, while arguing that sentient animals do have interests in their welfare. As a result, they argue that there are strong justifications for ecologists to shift their resources currently used for conservation biology, to welfare biology. It has also been asserted that if one is to accept an obligation to undertake systematic and large-scale efforts to help wild animals, that this would first require several important questions to be answered and that large-scale actions should only be carried out after a long phase of successful small-scale trials.

References

Further reading 
 

 
 
 

Animal ecology
Animal welfare
Branches of biology
biology
Wild animal suffering